Jan Janszoon de Heem (bapt. 2 July 1650, Antwerp – after 1695) was a Dutch Golden Age still-life painter and the son of Jan Davidszoon de Heem (1606–1684) and the half-brother of Cornelis de Heem (1631–1995). This family of still-life specialists, of which father Jan Davidszoon de Heem is the most significant, had a strong impact on the genre throughout the north and south Netherlands.

Jan was baptised in Antwerp on 2 July 1650, but was trained by his father in Utrecht. His works, in fact, are nearly indistinguishable from his father's, and the fact that they both signed them as J de Heem have meant that many paintings in major collections attributed to Jan Davidszoon are actually by Jan Janszoon.

References

 

1650 births
1690s deaths
Dutch Golden Age painters
Dutch male painters
Dutch still life painters
Artists from Antwerp
Flower artists